The Pifilca or Pivilca (Mapudungun language: onomatopoeia of its sound) is an aerophone of the flute family, a ductless flute, similar to a whistle. It is a typical instrument of the Mapuche people, and it is spread from central Chile to the Argentine provinces of Río Negro and Neuquén in Patagonia.

Description
It is an aerophone made of wood or stone, between 30 and 40 centimeters long. It is similar to a flute, in that it has a tube running the length of the instrument. However, unlike the other flutes), it has a single opening, where the hole was drilled. The musician has no holes to open and close to change notes. 

To play the instrument, the musician blows into the hole in the top center. The sound of the breath in the hole creates the instrument's single note, a rumble. Since the pifilca emits only one sound as an accompaniment or as a background for the rhythm .

References

Aerophones
Argentine musical instruments
Indigenous South American musical instruments
Mapuche culture